Mount Pluto may refer to:

Australia
Mount Pluto, Australia, a volcanic cone associated with Mount Hutton and Mount Playfair, in Northern Territory
Mount Pluto, Queensland, a locality in Whitsunday Region

United States
Mount Pluto, California, an 8617 ft. volcano in the Granite Chief Range near Lake Tahoe, California